Joseph Cannon (born January 1, 1975) is an American former professional soccer player. He spent the majority of his 16 professional seasons playing in Major League Soccer. His 86 MLS career shutouts ranks him fourth in league history. He won the MLS Goalkeeper of the Year Award twice (2002, 2004), and finished runner-up for the award three times (2000, 2001, 2005). 

He also earned two caps in friendlies with the United States men's national soccer team.

Early life and education 
Cannon was born January 1, 1975, in Sun Valley, Idaho, to Barbara and Joe Cannon.  As a child, he was raised in both Sun Valley, Idaho and Los Altos Hills, California.  He attended Hemingway Elementary School in Ketchum, Idaho, before moving permanently to California at age 12.  In California, he played high school soccer for Saint Francis High School.

Cannon attended college at the University of California, Santa Barbara for his first year and was a student-athlete on the UC Santa Barbara Gauchos men's soccer team.  He played in 11 games for the Gauchos in 1993 and recorded 3 shutouts.  He later transferred to Santa Clara University where he played for the Broncos from 1995 to 1997.  He graduated with a degree in political science.

Club career

San Diego Flash and San Jose Earthquakes 
Cannon was not drafted by a Major League Soccer team and instead signed with the San Diego Flash of the A-League in 1998.  He appeared in 28 games, posting 11 shutouts, en route to being named the Flash's Most Valuable Player.

After a season with the Flash, he was signed by Major League Soccer team San Jose Earthquakes.  After starting goalkeeper David Kramer tore the labrum in his shoulder, Cannon was promoted to the first team for the Quakes.  He remained as the starter until 2002, leading San Jose to victory in MLS Cup 2001 and winning his first MLS Goalkeeper of the Year Award in 2002.

French foray and return to MLS 
Cannon's Major League Soccer contract expired following the 2002 season and he attempted to play for a European team.  After an unsuccessful trial with Feyenoord, he signed a six-month contract with RC Lens of France's Ligue 1.  He was behind Charles Itandje in the Lens side and was not able to break into the first team.

Meanwhile, in MLS, the Earthquakes traded the rights to Cannon to the Colorado Rapids for three draft picks—a first round 2004 pick, and third and fourth round 2005 picks—and Cannon returned to play in America.

Cannon was initially behind incumbent goalkeeper Scott Garlick, but Rapids coach Tim Hankinson controversially promoted Cannon into the starting role for the 2003 playoffs.  Although Colorado did not advance, Garlick was traded to the Dallas Burn and Cannon kept his starting position.  The following season in 2004, Cannon won his second MLS Goalkeeper of the Year Award in addition to being named to the MLS Best XI and as a finalist for the MLS Most Valuable Player Award.

In December 2006, Cannon was traded to the Los Angeles Galaxy for Herculez Gomez and Ugo Ihemelu.  He made his Galaxy debut on April 8, 2007, in a 0–0 tie with the Houston Dynamo.  He spent one season with the club.

Later career 
Cannon returned to the Earthquakes via trade with the Galaxy for allocation money in January 2008.  He spent three seasons with the club.

Cannon was selected by Vancouver Whitecaps FC in the 2010 MLS Expansion Draft.  He re-signed with Vancouver for the 2012 Major League Soccer season.  Cannon retired following the 2013 Major League Soccer season.

International 
Cannon earned two caps with the United States men's national soccer team. His first cap came against New Zealand in 2003 where he played the first half of a 2–1 win. In 2004 he was called into several U.S. camps without gaining any game time. In 2005 he won his second cap, playing the first half of a friendly against Honduras.

Cannon's grandfather and father are Canadian, which made him eligible for the Canada men's national soccer team.

Post-playing career 
In March 2014, Cannon was announced as a color commentator for San Jose Earthquakes radio broadcasts on KLIV.

Personal life 
Cannon has a twin brother, Jon, who was a minor league baseball pitcher.  He has two other brothers, Cody and Colt.  His father, Joe Cannon Sr., was a country-western singer.

Career statistics

Honors

Club 

San Jose Earthquakes
MLS Cup: 2001

Individual 
MLS Goalkeeper of the Year: 2002, 2004
MLS Best XI: 2004

References

External links 

 
 US Soccer Players player profile
 
 

1975 births
Living people
People from Sun Valley, Idaho
2003 FIFA Confederations Cup players
American expatriate soccer players
American expatriate sportspeople in France
American soccer players
American sportspeople of Canadian descent
Colorado Rapids players
Expatriate footballers in France
Expatriate soccer players in Canada
Association football goalkeepers
LA Galaxy players
Sportspeople from the San Francisco Bay Area
RC Lens players
San Diego Flash players
San Jose Earthquakes players
Santa Clara Broncos men's soccer players
Soccer players from California
Soccer players from Idaho
UC Santa Barbara Gauchos men's soccer players
United States men's international soccer players
A-League (1995–2004) players
Vancouver Whitecaps FC players
Major League Soccer players
Major League Soccer All-Stars
People from Los Altos Hills, California
American soccer coaches
USL League Two coaches
American expatriate sportspeople in Canada